The Fontane della Piazza Farnese are two identical decorative fountains located in the Piazza Farnese,  in front of the Palazzo Farnese in Rome, Italy. They were placed in the Piazza in the 16th century.

History
The granite stone basins of the fountains are believed to come from the ancient Roman Baths of Caracalla. The emblems on the upper part of the fountain are those of the Farnese family, and the builder of the Palazzo, Cardinal Alessandro Farnese, later Pope Paul III.

See also
List of fountains in Rome.

References

External links

Piazza Farnese
Rome R. VII Regola